Richard Pearson (born 1961) is an American film editor who is mainly associated with action films. Pearson, with Clare Douglas and Christopher Rouse, received the BAFTA Award for Best Editing for the film United 93 (2006).

Life and career
Pearson was born in Minneapolis, Minnesota, and raised in New Hope, Minnesota. As a college student in the early 1980s, Pearson was an intern at the television station WCCO-TV in Minneapolis. He moved to Hollywood in 1985 to pursue a career in the entertainment industry. His first editing credit was for the television miniseries From the Earth to the Moon (1998). The "1968" episode of From the Earth to the Moon was nominated for an American Cinema Editors "Eddie" award (Best Edited Episode from a Television Mini-Series) and for an Emmy Award (Outstanding Single Camera Picture Editing for a Miniseries or a Movie). Christopher Rouse, Pearson's co-editor on The Bourne Supremacy and United 93, also worked on this miniseries.

Following an editing credit for the film Muppets from Space (1999), Pearson edited two films (Bowfinger and The Score) that were directed by Frank Oz, who was Jim Henson's early collaborator in developing The Muppets.

United 93 was directed by Paul Greengrass, who is particularly noted for films that are "shot verité style as a detailed mass of hectic vignettes—jagged jump cuts, sudden blackouts, overlapping everything." The use of three editors (Douglas, Pearson, and Rouse) on United 93 was dictated by its short post-production period; less than six months passed between the start of filming and release of the film. Greengrass and Douglas had worked together quite successfully on the film Bloody Sunday (2002); Greengrass, Pearson, and Rouse had recently finished The Bourne Supremacy (2004). Despite the accelerated post-production schedule for United 93, the editing was very successful. Ellen Feldman has written an analysis of the film's editing; she notes that, "United 93 represents a complex editing feat, with a structure based on parallel cutting combined with an edgy, hyper-cranked "Cinema Verité” style, a style that disorients us but doesn't prevent us from grasping lots of necessary exposition and identifying with many characters." In addition to the BAFTA Award, the editors were also nominated for an Academy Award for Film Editing and for an ACE Eddie Award.

Pearson has been elected to membership in the American Cinema Editors.

Pearson was an editor of the James Bond film, Quantum of Solace (2008), along with Matt Chesse. He worked on Safe House (2012). He resides in California.

Editing credits
From the Earth to the Moon (1998) (episodes 3, 4, 7, 12)
Muppets from Space (1999) (with Michael A. Stevenson)
Bowfinger (1999)
Drowning Mona (2000)
The Score (2001)
Men in Black II (2002) (with Steven Weisberg)
The Rundown (2003)
The Bourne Supremacy (2004) (with Christopher Rouse)
A Little Trip to Heaven (2005)
Rent (2005)
United 93 (2006) (with Clare Douglas and Christopher Rouse)
Blades of Glory (2007) (with Max Coyne)
Get Smart (2008)
Quantum of Solace (2008) (with Matt Chesse)
Iron Man 2 (2010) (with Dan Lebental)
Safe House (2012)
Red Dawn (2012)
Maleficent (2014) (with Chris Lebenzon)
The Accountant (2016)
Kong: Skull Island (2017)
Justice League (2017) (with David Brenner and Martin Walsh)
Godzilla: King of the Monsters (2019) (with Roger Barton and Bob Ducsay)
Wonder Woman 1984 (2020)
Uncharted (2022) (with Chris Lebenzon)
Lyle, Lyle, Crocodile (2022)

References

External links

1961 births
Living people
American Cinema Editors
American film editors
Best Editing BAFTA Award winners
People from Minneapolis
People from New Hope, Minnesota